Charlotte Canda (February 3, 1828 – February 3, 1845), sometimes referred to simply as "Miss Canda", was a young debutante who died in a horse carriage accident on the way home from her seventeenth birthday party in New York City. She is memorialized by a Victorian mausoleum in Green-Wood Cemetery, Brooklyn by Robert Launitz and John Frazee. The ornately and expensively decorated monument attracted thousands of visitors to Green-Wood Cemetery in the late 19th century.

Background
Charlotte's father, Charles Canda, was an officer in Napoleon's army and the headmaster of a school on Lafayette Place in Manhattan. He and his wife, Adele Canda, adopted Charlotte when she was an infant. Charles Canda was dropping one of Charlotte's friends off at a home on Waverly Place in Manhattan on her 17th birthday when the horses became spooked, perhaps because of a storm, and bolted. Charlotte fell out of the moving carriage at Broadway and Waverly Place, hitting her head on the pavement. She died in her father's arms.

Burial
Canda, as a Catholic, was first interred at the Old Saint Patrick's Cathedral at Prince Street and Mott Street. Her monumental mausoleum, completed in 1847, is located at Greenbough Avenue and Fern Avenue within Green-Wood Cemetery in Brooklyn. She was interred in consecrated ground at the cemetery on April 29, 1848.

The monument is constructed of white Carrara marble in the style of a tabernacle and features Gothic Revival architecture stylings such as spires, carved flowers, and angels. A large statue of Canda in her birthday gown is displayed beneath a marble canopy. In an 1893 article, The New World remarked on her "fair form still preserved in Marble." Sculptor Launitz did the tomb design work along with Frazee, although Frazee's role has been called into question by some of his biographers. The design was based in part on Canda's own sketches for a memorial to her aunt, Clemence Canda, who had died the year before.

Symbolism at the monument includes books (Charlotte was fluent in five languages); musical instruments; drawing tools; down-turned torches, signifying extinguished life (except life that burns in the hereafter); parrots (her pets); and seventeen roses (she was celebrating her seventeenth birthday). The monument is also seventeen feet high and seventeen feet long.

The mausoleum cost more than $45,000 (equivalent to $1,538,988.16 in 2020) and was once a popular monument for visitors in Green-Wood Cemetery, attracting crowds. In the late 19th century, New Yorkers used to picnic at the cemetery. The expense and spectacle of the memorial, together with the romantic tragedy of the young heiress's death, attracted such a degree of public attention that for some decades after her death, references in popular press simply to "Miss Canda" could be understood to refer to Charlotte.

Charles Albert Jarrett de la Marie (1819–1847), said to be Canda's fiancé, committed suicide a year after her death and is buried nearby. As a suicide, he could not be buried on consecrated ground with his bride-to-be and was instead buried in unconsecrated ground nearby under a small upright tombstone with his family's coat of arms.

Tributes

Andrea Janes (A. J. Sweeney) wrote a story in tribute to Charlotte Canda.

In 1897, Daniel Pelton published a collection of poems entitled Greenwood, An Elegy: Meditations Among the Tombs, in which he included an ode to Charlotte Canda:

Image gallery

References

People from New York City
Deaths by horse-riding accident in the United States
1828 births
1845 deaths
Accidental deaths in New York (state)
Burials at Green-Wood Cemetery
Mausoleums in the United States
American children
Accidental deaths from falls
Road incident deaths in New York City
Marble sculptures in New York City